Tomás Róchez Miguel (born 1 October 1964) is a retired Honduran football player who made his name with the national team in the early 1990s.

Club career
Róchez played for Marathón, Olimpia, Tela Timsa and had a short spell at Mexican side Santos Laguna alongside compatriot Luis Enrique Cálix.

International career
Róchez made his debut for Honduras in a June 1991 CONCACAF Gold Cup match against Jamaica and has earned a total of 25 caps, scoring 1 goal. He has represented his country in 6 FIFA World Cup qualification matches and played at the 1993 UNCAF Nations Cup, as well as at the 1991, and 1993 CONCACAF Gold Cups.

His final international was a June 1994 friendly match against South Korea.

International goals
Scores and results list Honduras' goal tally first.

Honours and awards

Country
Honduras
Copa Centroamericana (1): 1993,

References

External links

 

1964 births
Living people
People from Ocotepeque Department
Association football defenders
Honduran footballers
Honduras international footballers
1991 CONCACAF Gold Cup players
1993 CONCACAF Gold Cup players
C.D. Marathón players
C.D. Olimpia players
Santos Laguna footballers
Honduran expatriate footballers
Honduran expatriate sportspeople in Mexico
Expatriate footballers in Mexico
Liga Nacional de Fútbol Profesional de Honduras players
Liga MX players